Hans Stangassinger (born 5 January 1960 in Berchtesgaden, Bavaria) was a West German luger who competed in the early 1980s. He won the gold medal in the men's doubles event at the 1984 Winter Olympics in Sarajevo.

Stangassinger also won two bronze medals in the men's doubles event at the FIL World Luge Championships (1981, 1983). At the FIL European Luge Championships, he also won two medals in the men's doubles event with a silver in 1984 and a bronze in 1982.

Stangassinger's best overall Luge World Cup finish was second in men's doubles in 1982-3.

References 
 

 
 
  
 

1960 births
Living people
People from Berchtesgaden
Sportspeople from Upper Bavaria
German male lugers
Lugers at the 1984 Winter Olympics
Olympic lugers of West Germany
Olympic gold medalists for West Germany
Olympic medalists in luge
Medalists at the 1984 Winter Olympics
20th-century German people